Karl Theodor Leopold Liebe (11 February 1828 - 5 June 1894) was a German geologist and ornithologist. A pioneer in bird conservation, he established the first bird protection agency in Germany.

Liebe was born in Neustadt an der Orla. His father was a clergyman while his grandfather was an eye specialist. His mother was the daughter of a physician. He observed birds in the garden of his grandfather as a boy and visited Christian Ludwig Brehm at Renthendorf. At school he took an interest in geology but was unable to find the means to study Mining and Geology. He studied at Neustadt, Zeitz and Weimar. Between 1848 and 1852 he studied theology, mathematics and natural science at the University of Jena. He obtained a doctorate for his studies in geology. From 1852 to 1855 he taught in Hamburg at Dr Schleiden's Gymnasium.

Liebe observed the birdlife of Thuringia and noted the decline of many species in 1878. He founded the German Society for Bird Protection in the same year which helped in establishing the Imperial Law on Bird Protection in 1888. In 1891 Liebe criticised the use of economic reasons for bird protection at the Budapest International Ornithological Congress. He believed that ethical and aesthetic reasons were foremost and that it was the moral duty of humans to protect birds.

Writings 
 Liebe, Karl Theodor (1893) Ornithologische Schriften. Gesammelt und herausgegeben von Carl R. Hennicke. Leipzig, Verlag von W. Malende.

References 

1828 births
1894 deaths
19th-century German geologists
German ornithologists